Sjoerd Marijne (born 20 April 1974) is a Dutch former field hockey player and former coach of the Indian women's national team.

He played for ten years as part of Den Bosch in the Hoofdklasse.

As coach of Indian women's team
He coached the Indian team at the 2018 Women's Hockey World Cup, where India lost in the quarterfinals to Ireland.

Tokyo Olympics 2020 
At the beginning of the Tokyo Olympics, India was ranked number 8 in the world and was not considered a serious contender. India had a historic showing under his coaching, reaching the semifinals for the first time. They had a disastrous start to the tournament, losing in succession to the Netherlands (1 - 5), Germany (0 - 2) and Great Britain (1 - 4) in the group stage. However, India beat Ireland 1 - 0 and South Africa 4 - 3 to qualify for the quarterfinals. There, they stunned then World no. 3 Australia 1 - 0, to advance to the semifinal stage for the first time in history. However, India lost to World no. 2 Argentina 1 - 2 in the semifinal and had to settle to competing for bronze. India lost the bronze medal match narrowly to Great Britain 3 - 4, and finished fourth. Marijne is widely credited for the Indian team's turnaround after decades of dismal showings.

On 6 August 2021, after India's loss to Great Britain, Marijne announced that he would retire as the head coach of the India women's team to spend more time with his family.

References

External links
 

1974 births
Living people
Dutch field hockey coaches
Sportspeople from 's-Hertogenbosch
HC Den Bosch players
Men's Hoofdklasse Hockey players